Radical 140 or  radical grass meaning "grass" is one of 29 of the 214 Kangxi radicals that are composed of 6 strokes. It transforms into  when appearing at the top of a character or component. In the Kangxi Dictionary and in modern standard Traditional Chinese as used in Taiwan, Hong Kong and Macau,  (with two horizontal strokes) consists of four strokes, while in Simplified Chinese and modern Japanese,  (with a continuous horizontal stroke) consists of three strokes.

In the Kangxi Dictionary there are 1902 characters (out of 40,000) found under this radical, making it the most commonly used radical.

Evolution

Derived characters

Variant forms
This radical character is written differently in different languages. Traditionally, breaking the horizontal stroke in 艹 is optional in both printing and written forms. The Kangxi Dictionary adopted  the four-stroke form .

In today's Simplified Chinese, only the three-stroke form  is used; The four-stroke form  is treated as an obsolete typeface form after the adoption of xin zixing. In modern Traditional Chinese as used in Taiwan, Hong Kong, and Macau, the four-stroke form  is standard, while the three-stroke form is still overwhelmingly preferred in publications.

In Japanese, only the three-stroke form is used for jōyō kanji (commonly used Chinese characters); the three-stroke form is recommended for hyōgai kanji, while the four-stroke form is listed as an acceptable "design difference" in Hyōgai Kanji Jitaihyō and JIS X 0208.

In addition,  is derived from the cursive form of 艹.

References

 KangXi:  page 1017, character 1
 Dai Kanwa Jiten: character 30638
 Dae Jaweon:  page 1475, character 6
 Hanyu Da Zidian:  volume 5, page 3172, character 1
 Unihan data for U+8278

140
030